Fripp is a comedy novel by Miles Tredinnick.  It tells the story of a young private investigator, Twyford Fripp, taking on his very first case in attempting to track down the missing wife of a Rear Admiral.  It was first published in 2001 and a Kindle ebook version was released in 2011. Fripp is the author's first novel.

Synopsis
Retired Rear Admiral Peter Legg has a delicate problem. He is suffering from satyriasis (the male equivalent of nymphomania) and his constant craving for sexual excitement with the local Madam, Miss Forde, and her working girls, Forde's Escorts, have left him broke and despondent. Furthermore, his long-suffering wife Margot has deserted him. In desperation he attends a newly opened sexual addiction clinic run by the handsome, breakfast TV doctor Ryan Hooper. When this fails to solve his problems he decides to employ a young private detective, Twyford Fripp, to track down his wife and hopefully bring her back. Unfortunately, it's Twyford Fripp's very first case...

External links
Fripp site

2001 novels
British comedy novels
British crime novels